The Khoury College of Computer Sciences is the computer science school of Northeastern University in Boston, Massachusetts. It was the first college in the United States dedicated to the field of computer science when it was founded in 1982.  In addition to computer science, it specializes in data science and cybersecurity. The college was also among the first to offer an information assurance degree program. 

Khoury College offers Bachelor of Science (B.S.), Bachelor of Arts (B.A.), Master of Science (M.S.) and doctoral degrees in computer science, as well as undergraduate and graduate degrees in interdisciplinary, computer-related fields. Some 1,000 master's and 133 doctoral candidates are enrolled in the college.

History

Throughout the 1980s, Northeastern University made about 38 program and curriculum changes to improve the university. Between 1979 and 1981, Northeastern organized a blue-ribbon panel of educators and experts, including industry leaders from Bell Labs, University of California, Berkeley, Massachusetts Institute of Technology (MIT) and the Digital Equipment Corporation, to develop a plan to advance education and research in the emerging field of computer science. In 1982, Northeastern formally established the College of Computer Science (CCS), the first U.S. college devoted to computer science and the first new college at Northeastern in 17 years. Paul Kalaghan, director of Academic Computer Services, was named its first dean. The college was initially housed in Knowles-Volpe Hall, now known as the Asa S. Knowles Center, with 11 faculty members and 239 first-year students. Graduate degree programs were added in 1984. A year later, the college moved into the former Botolph Building, one of the oldest structures on campus, which reopened as the David and Margaret Fitzgerald Cullinane Hall. At the end of 1987, the CCS proposed the Law of Demeter, which was widely used in software development area. In 2004, the college moved into the newly constructed West Village H building, which consists of a six-story building and a 16-story tower containing the Khoury College of Computer Science and on-campus housing for 485 students.

Naming donation

On December 16, 2018, Northeastern University announced a $50 million gift from alumnus and board trustee, Amin Khoury, in order to "support all aspects of the college's future focus." In return, the College of Computer and Information Science was renamed the Khoury College of Computer Sciences.

Northeastern Deans of Computer Science
 Paul Kalaghan, 1982–1988
 Alan Selman (acting), 1988–1990
 Cynthia Brown, 1990–1994
 Larry Finkelstein, 1994–2014
 Carla Brodley, 2014–2021
 Alan Mislove (interim), 2021–2022
 Elizabeth Mynatt, 2022–present

Academic programs
In addition to a traditional computer science curriculum, Khoury College offers numerous other information science programs at both the undergraduate and graduate levels.

Computer science

The computer science program at Khoury College focuses on the fundamentals of computer program design, software design, computer networking, computation theory, and other technical computer-related subjects.

Undergraduate degrees

The CS program offers both Bachelor of Science and Bachelor of Arts degrees. While both require a core curriculum of computer science, mathematics, science, and humanities coursework, the B.A. candidates are required to take more humanities coursework than B.S. candidates. The B.S. is thus the more technical of the two degrees, with the B.A. aimed at giving students a social science context with which to frame their understanding of computer science. Khoury College offers the following degrees:

B.S. in Computer Science
B.S. in Cybersecurity
B.A. in Computer Science
B.S. in Information Science
B.S. in Data Science

Combined majors

Khoury College offers multiple combined major degree options within its own programs:

 B.S. in Computer Science and Information Science
 B.S. and M.S. in Computer Science
 B.S. and M.S. in Data Science

The combined B.S. and M.S. in Computer Science substitutes four master-level courses for their undergraduate equivalents. Students then have only to take four master-level electives to complete the program. This allows a student to graduate with both degrees on either a five-year track, or a six-year track with an additional co-op experience.

In addition, the College partners with other colleges at Northeastern to offer several joint degrees, such as combining Computer Science with Journalism, Game Design or Interactive Media.

Information science

Information science—the interdisciplinary study of how humans use information technology—combines a technical understanding of computer science and system design with the behavior context of the social sciences. Coursework covers the fields of information architecture, information system design and development, programming design, database design, and social informatics, among others. A two-semester senior capstone project, designed to integrate the many skill sets developed in the program, is required. Currently, only the B.S. of Information Science is offered, though it may be offered in conjunction with another degree.

Graduate degrees

Khoury College offers both Master of Science and doctoral degrees. In 2018, Khoury College's graduate program in computer science was ranked 49th in the list of the "Best Computer Science Graduate Schools." The publication also ranked the graduate program 12th on its list of "Best Programming Language Programs."

Master's degrees

Khoury College offers the following master's degrees:

 MS in Computer Science 
 Align MS in Computer Science (for people who did not study computer science as undergrads)
 MS in Cybersecurity
 MS in Data Science
 MS in Artificial Intelligence
 MS in Robotics
 MS in Health Informatics
 MS in Health Data Analytics
 MS in Game Science and Design

Candidates for the MS in Computer Science can choose from the following concentrations:

Artificial intelligence
Human–computer interaction
Database management
Graphics
Information security
Networks
Programming languages
Software engineering
Systems
Theory

Khoury College began offering the M.S. in Information Assurance (now the MS in Cybersecurity) in 2006, for which it has gained recognition by the National Security Agency as both a National Center of Academic Excellence in Information Assurance Education and Center of Academic Excellence in Information Assurance Research. Masters candidates take coursework addressing the various technical, policy, and criminal justice-related issues involved in information assurance, preparing them for careers as corporate and government information executives. Full-time candidates for the M.S. in Cybersecurity typically finish the program in two years, with 32 semester hours required to earn the degree.

PhD program

The PhD program prepares students for research careers in government, industry, or academia. Candidates are required to take coursework in computer systems, principles of programming languages, advanced algorithms, and computation theory. Electives in these and other subjects are also available. Candidates are given a maximum of five years to complete this coursework and their doctoral thesis. Khoury College offers four PhD programs:

 PhD in Computer Science
 PhD in Network Science
 PhD in Information Assurance
 PhD in Personal Health Informatics

In the 2011–2012 school year, the information assurance program began offering the Ph.D in Information Assurance, designed to be an interdisciplinary program with a focus on information assurance policy and research. Candidates for this doctoral degree take a core curriculum of computer networking, network security, hardware and software security, information security risk management, and information assurance policy. Elective coursework is then taken in one of three areas of concentration (or "tracks"), namely:

 Network/Communication Security
 System Security
 Policy/Society

Candidates for the PhD in Information Assurance have a maximum of five years to complete their required coursework and doctoral thesis.

The PhD in Personal Health Informatics is an interdisciplinary Doctoral Program in Personal Health Informatics prepares researchers to design and evaluate technologies that improve health and wellness with the potential to transform healthcare. The joint degree program combines a strong curriculum in human-computer interface technology and experimental design in health sciences.

Student groups
The following student groups and organizations are part of the Khoury College community:

Association for Computing Machinery (ACM)
Computer Science Mentoring Organization (CoSMO)
Undergraduate Experimental Systems Group (Crew), a volunteer student group supporting the Khoury IT systems staff
Upsilon Pi Epsilon Honor Society (UPE)
Northeastern University Women in Technology (NUWiT)
Northeastern Game Development Club 
Information Systems Security Association
Out in Science, Technology, Engineering, and Mathematics (oSTEM)
Northeastern University DATA Club

Students of the college also participate in a variety of information security competitions, most notably the National Collegiate Cyber Defense Competition. The College's team won its regional qualifier, the Northeast Collegiate Cyber Defense Competition ("NECCDC"), in 2009, and took first place at the national competition in 2010. Khoury College was host to the Northeast Collegiate Cyber Defense Competition in 2011.

Cooperative education within Khoury College
Students at Khoury College have the option of participating in Northeastern's Cooperative Education Program ("co-op program"). The co-op program allows students to take semester-long internships with public and private-sector organizations, exposing them to the real world application of the skills and knowledge taught in their academic major. Nearly two-thirds of Khoury College's graduating students are offered full-time positions by the companies for at which they worked a co-op.

Companies that participate in this program range from small startups to large enterprises including Google, Microsoft, John Hancock, and Amazon.com. The college has been able to achieve 100% placement in the past 7 years for all students who choose to go on 5-year co-op program.

Key people
 Carla Brodley, Professor, Dean of Inclusive Computing, Northeastern University
 Matthias Felleisen, Trustee Professor
 William Clinger, Associate Professor Emeritus
 David Lazer, Distinguished Professor
 Albert-László Barabási, Distinguished Professor
 Alessandro Vespignani, Distinguished Professor
 Renée Miller, Distinguished Professor

References

External links
 Khoury College of Computer Sciences website
 Northeastern University website

Northeastern University
Educational institutions established in 1982
University subdivisions in Massachusetts
1982 establishments in Massachusetts